A vulnerable plaque is a kind of atheromatous plaque – a collection of white blood cells (primarily macrophages) and lipids (including cholesterol) in the wall of an artery – that is particularly unstable and prone to produce sudden major problems such as a heart attack or stroke.

The defining characteristics of a vulnerable plaque include but are not limited to: a thin fibrous cap, large lipid-rich necrotic core, increased plaque inflammation, positive vascular remodeling, increased vasa-vasorum neovascularization, and intra-plaque hemorrhage. These characteristics together with the usual hemodynamic pulsating expansion during systole and elastic recoil contraction during diastole contribute to a high mechanical stress zone on the fibrous cap of the atheroma, making it prone to rupture. Increased hemodynamic stress, e.g. increased blood pressure, especially pulse pressure (systolic blood pressure vs. diastolic blood pressure difference), correlates with increased rates of major cardiovascular events associated with exercise, especially exercise beyond levels the individual does routinely.

Generally an atheroma becomes vulnerable if it grows more rapidly and has a thin cover separating it from the bloodstream inside the arterial lumen. Tearing of the cover is called plaque rupture. However, a repeated atheroma rupture and healing is one of the mechanisms, perhaps the dominant one, that creates artery stenosis.

Formation
Researchers have found that accumulation of white blood cells, especially macrophages, termed inflammation, in the walls of the arteries leads to the development of "soft" or vulnerable plaque, which when released aggressively promotes blood clotting.

Researchers now think that vulnerable plaque, (see atherosclerosis) is formed in the following way:
 Hyperlipidemia, hypertension, smoking, homocysteine, hemodynamic factors, toxins, viruses, and/or immune reactions results in chronic endothelial injury, dysfunction, and increased permeability.
 Lipoprotein LDL particles, which carry fats (including the fat cholesterol made by every human cell) within the water/plasma portion of the blood stream, are absorbed into the intima, past the endothelium lining, some of the LDL-lipoprotein particles become oxidized and this attracts macrophages that uptake the particles. This process typically starts in childhood. To be specific: oxidized lipoprotein particles in the artery wall are an irritant which causes the release of proteins (called cytokines) which attract monocyte white blood cells (white blood cells are the inflammatory cells within the body).
 The cytokines induce the endothelial cells lining the artery wall to display adhesion molecules that attract immune-system white blood cells (to be specific, monocytes).
 The monocytes squeeze into the artery wall. Once inside, they transform into macrophages which will ingest the oxidized lipoprotein particles.
 The macrophages sometimes become so overloaded with oxidized lipoprotein particles, the cholesterol contained therein and membrane-laden that they are called foam cells. Some of these cells die in place, releasing their fat and cholesterol-laden membranes into the intercellular space. This attracts more macrophages and smooth muscle cell migration and proliferation.
 Smooth muscle cells migrate from the media to the intima, proliferate, and develop an extracellular matrix made up of collagen and proteoglycans.
 In some regions of increased macrophage activity, macrophage-induced-enzymes erode away the fibrous membrane beneath the endothelium so that the cover separating the plaque from blood flow in the lumen becomes thin and fragile.
 Mechanical stretching and contraction of the artery, with each heart beat, i.e. the pulse, results in rupture of the thin covering membrane, spewing clot-promoting plaque contents into the blood stream.
 The clotting system reacts and forms clots both on the particles shed into the blood stream and locally over the rupture. The clot, if large enough, can block all blood flow. Since all the blood, within seconds, passes through 5-micrometre capillaries, any particles much larger than 5 micrometres block blood flow. (most of the occlusions are too small to see by angiography).
 Most ruptures and clotting events are too small to produce symptoms, though they still produce heart muscle damage, a slow progressive process resulting in ischemic heart disease, the most common basis for congestive heart failure.
 The clot organizes and contracts over time, leaving behind narrowing(s) called stenoses. These narrowing(s) are responsible for the symptoms of the disease and are identified, after the fact, by the changes seen on stress tests and angiography, and treated with bypass surgery and/or angioplasty, with or without stents.

When this inflammation is combined with other stresses, such as high blood pressure (increased mechanical stretching and contraction of the arteries with each heart beat), it can cause the thin covering over the plaque to split, spilling the contents of the vulnerable plaque into the bloodstream. Recent studies have shown cholesterol crystals within the plaque play a key role in splitting the plaque and also inducing inflammation. The sticky cytokines on the artery wall capture blood cells (mainly platelets) that accumulate at the site of injury. When these cells clump together, they form a thrombus, sometimes large enough to block the artery.

The most frequent cause of a cardiac event following rupture of a vulnerable plaque is blood clotting on top of the site of the ruptured plaque that blocks the lumen of the artery, thereby stopping blood flow to the tissues the artery supplies.

Upon rupture, atheroma tissue debris may spill into the blood stream; this debris has cholesterol crystals and other material which is often too large (over 5 micrometers) to pass on through the capillaries downstream. In this, the usual situation, the debris obstruct smaller downstream branches of the artery resulting in temporary to permanent end artery/capillary closure with loss of blood supply to, and death of, the previously supplied tissues. A severe case of this can be seen during angioplasty in the slow clearance of injected contrast down the artery lumen. This situation is often termed non-reflow.

In addition, atheroma rupture may allow bleeding from the lumen into the inner tissue of the atheroma, making the atheroma size suddenly increase and protrude into the lumen of the artery, producing lumen narrowing or even total obstruction.

Detection
While a single ruptured plaque can be identified during autopsy as the cause of a coronary event, there is currently no way to identify a culprit lesion before it ruptures.

Because artery walls typically enlarge in response to enlarging plaques, these plaques do not usually produce much stenosis of the artery lumen. Therefore, they are not detected by cardiac stress tests or angiography, the tests most commonly performed clinically with the goal of predicting susceptibility to future heart attack. In contrast to conventional angiography, cardiac CT angiography does enable visualization of the vessel wall as well as plaque composition. Some of the CT derived plaque characteristics can help predict for acute coronary syndrome. In addition, because these lesions do not produce significant stenoses, they are typically not considered "critical" and/or interventionable by interventional cardiologists, even though research indicates that they are the more important lesions for producing heart attacks.

The tests most commonly performed clinically with the goal of testing susceptibility to future heart attack include several medical research efforts, starting in the early to mid-1990s, using intravascular ultrasound (IVUS), thermography, near-infrared spectroscopy, careful clinical follow-up, and other methods, to predict these lesions and the individuals most prone to future heart attacks. These efforts remain largely research with no useful clinical methods to date (2006). Furthermore, the usefulness of detecting individual vulnerable plaques by invasive methods has been questioned because many "vulnerable" plaques rupture without any associated symptoms and it remains unclear if the risk of invasive detection methods is outweighed by clinical benefit.

Another approach to detecting and understanding plaque behavior, used in research and by a few clinicians, is to use ultrasound to non-invasively measure wall thickness (usually abbreviated IMT) in portions of larger arteries closest to the skin, such as the carotid or femoral arteries. While stability vs. vulnerability cannot be readily distinguished in this way, quantitative baseline measurements of the thickest portions of the arterial wall (locations with the most plaque accumulation). Documenting the IMT, location of each measurement and plaque size, a basis for tracking and partially verifying the effects of medical treatments on the progression, stability, or potential regression of plaque, within a given individual over time, may be achieved.

Vulnerable plaque vs stable plaque 
The factors involved to promote either a vulnerable plaque or a stable plaque are not clear yet, however, the major differences between a vulnerable and stable plaque are that vulnerable plaques have a ''rich-lipid core'' and a ''thin fibrous cap'' in comparison with the ''thick fibrous cap'' and the ''poor lipid plaque'' present in the stable plaque. In case of a vulnerable plaque, this results in a larger diameter of the Artery Lumen, which means that patient's life style is not affected, however, when the thin fibrous cap breaks, this causes a prompt activation of platelets which causes the occlusion of the artery, which causes a sudden heart attack if it occurs in the coronary artery.

Concerning stable plaques, the thick fibrous cap avoids the breaking risks, however, it reduces significantly the artery diameter which causes the cardiovascular problems related to the decreasing of vessel's diameter (this is determined by the Hagen–Poiseuille equation which explains how flow-rate is related to the radius of the vessel to the fourth power).

Prevention
Patients can lower their risk for vulnerable plaque rupture in the same ways that they can cut their heart attack risk: Optimize lipoprotein patterns, keep blood glucose levels low normal (see HbA1c), stay slender, eat a proper diet, quit smoking, and maintain a regular exercise program. Researchers also think that obesity and diabetes may be tied to high levels of C-reactive protein.

References

Cardiovascular diseases
Neurology